The Palmdale Railroad was a  horse-drawn railroad which existed only briefly in present-day Palm Springs, California, built in 1888.

Originally proposed by a Professor Wheaton, a Boston native who relocated to the desert due to asthma, the railroad was part of a larger development which included  of orange groves.

Running primarily down present-day Farrell Drive to the proposed settlement of Palmdale at the foot of Mount San Jacinto near the present-day settlement of Snow Creek (not to be confused with the Antelope Valley city of the same name), the line was abandoned by 1893 due to lack of water.  Ties from the right-of-way were used to build the Cornelia White House, which still stands today in downtown Palm Springs.

For years after its abandonment, a single, dilapidated horse-drawn car remained in the desert as a sort of landmark to travelers.  The car is no longer visible and is presumed to be buried beneath the sand.

The California Office of Historic Preservation recognized the site of the railroad as a point of interest on November 3, 1969.

See also

 List of railway museums
 List of heritage railways

References

External links
 Self-guided tour of downtown Palm Springs including the Cornelia White House at www.pspf.net
 Palmdale Railroad listing at Office of Historic Preservation's website

Palm Springs, California
Coachella Valley
Defunct California railroads
1888 establishments in California
1893 disestablishments in California
Transportation in Riverside County, California
History of Riverside County, California
Railway lines opened in 1888